Henry Hawkins (1577 – 18 August 1646) was an English Jesuit writer.  His best known work is the emblem book Partheneia Sacra: Or the Mysterious and Delicious Garden of the Sacred Parthenes (originally published in 1633; reprinted in 1950 and again in 1971).

Life
Henry was the son of Sir Thomas Hawkins and Anne Pettyt. He was baptized in Boughton under Blean on 8 October 1577. He married Aphra Norton in February 1604, and was widowed in January 1605.

Hawkins entered the English College, Rome, as a mature student on 19 March 1609, was ordained on 25 March 1614, and entered the Society of Jesus in 1615. After serving many years on the English Mission he died in Ghent on 18 August 1646.

Works
 History of S. Elizabeth (Rouen, 1632)
 The admirable life of S. Aldegond (1632), a translation of La vie admirable de la princesse Ste. Aldegonde by Etienne Binet
 Partheneia Sacra (Rouen, 1633)
 The Devout Heart (Rouen, 1634), a translation of Le coeur dévot by Etienne Luzvic

References

External links
 Partheneia Sacra, 1633 on Google Books.

1646 deaths
17th-century English Jesuits
French–English translators
17th-century English writers
17th-century English male writers
English male writers
1577 births
People from Boughton under Blean